Tropidacris is a genus of grasshopper in the family Romaleidae. Species within this genus are present in Central and Southern America.

Species
Tropidacris collaris (Stoll, 1813)
Tropidacris cristata (Linnaeus, 1758)
Tropidacris descampsi Carbonell, 1986

Gallery

References

Caelifera genera
Romaleidae